The Triple J Hottest 100 of the 2010s was held on the 14 March 2020. It is a countdown of the most popular songs of the 2010s as chosen by listeners of Australian radio station Triple J. 1.8 million votes were cast by listeners choosing their top ten songs of the decade.

Tame Impala's "The Less I Know the Better" was voted into first place.

Background
Triple J's Hottest 100 of the 2010s allowed members of the public to vote online for their top ten songs of the decade, which were then used to calculate the decade's 100 most popular songs. Any song initially released between 1 January 2010 and 31 December 2019 was eligible for the decade's Hottest 100.

On 23 January 2020, Triple J first announced that a 2010s countdown would take place. Voting opened on 11 February 2020, and closed on 9 March 2020. Between 10 and 13 March, Triple J presenters Lucy Smith, Lewis Hobba, and Michael Hing progressively announced the songs that ranked between #200 and #101 in the countdown. Voting in recent countdowns has been restricted to the preceding year. There have been some exceptions, namely the Hottest 100 Australian Albums of All Time in 2011, and the Hottest 100 of the Past 20 Years in 2013. This is the first countdown that charts the best songs of a decade.

Projections
Based on media reports following the announcement of the existence of the countdown, some of the most frequently mentioned contenders are Frank Ocean, Lorde, Lana Del Rey, Kendrick Lamar, Flume, and Beyoncé. Once voting closed, bookmakers' three most likely songs to take #1 were Gotye's "Somebody That I Used to Know" (featuring Kimbra), Arctic Monkeys' "Do I Wanna Know?" and Rüfüs' "Innerbloom", both behind Gotye.

Full list

Countries represented
 Australia – 50
 United States – 28
 United Kingdom – 15
 New Zealand – 3
 Sweden – 3
 France – 2
 Belgium – 1
 Canada – 1
 Germany – 1
 Israel – 1
 Netherlands – 1

Artists with multiple entries

Seven entries
 Flume (four times solo, once with Chet Faker and two remixes; 8, 18, 48, 69, 82, 93, 98)

Five entries
 Kanye West (14, 24, 72, 77, 80)

Four entries
 Tame Impala (1, 26, 65, 66)
 Kendrick Lamar (23, 57, 60, 92)

Three entries
 Arctic Monkeys (3, 42, 73)
 Gang of Youths (6, 19, 52)
 Sticky Fingers (15, 33, 58)
 Hilltop Hoods (20, 36, 67)
 Childish Gambino (27, 28, 90)

Two entries
 Rüfüs Du Sol (5, 64)
 Angus & Julia Stone (9, 43)
 Matt Corby (10, 87)
 Chet Faker (once solo and once with Flume; 11, 69)
 Lorde (16, 61)
 DMA's (21, 41)
 Jay-Z (once as a lead artist and once with Kanye West; 24, 72)
 Flight Facilities (25, 39)
 The Wombats (31, 86)
 Frank Ocean (34, 62)
 Disclosure (40, 98)
 Hermitude (48, 63)
 Sia (once solo and once with Hilltop Hoods; 53, 67)
 Bon Iver (once solo and once with Kanye West; 72, 100)
 Ruel (83, 99)

Songs by year

Notes
Including remixes and a collaboration, Australian producer Flume had seven tracks voted into the countdown. No artist has achieved more tracks in a Hottest 100 countdown since The Cure's nine in 1991's Hottest 100 of All Time.
Nine songs appeared in the countdown that have never appeared previously in a Hottest 100: Rüfüs Du Sol's "Innerbloom", Sticky Fingers' "Rum Rage", Avicii's "Levels", Azealia Banks' "212", Robyn's "Dancing on My Own", J. Cole's "No Role Modelz", Rex Orange County's "Loving Is Easy", Kendrick Lamar's "M.A.A.D City", and Adele's "Rolling in the Deep".
Azealia Banks, Rex Orange County, and Adele marked their first ever appearance in any Hottest 100 countdown.
Some of these tracks narrowly missed the top 100 in their annual countdowns, including "Innerbloom" (#103 in 2015), "Loving is Easy" (#107 in 2017), and "Rum Rage" (#124 in 2014).
Twelve songs appeared at a higher position than their initial annual countdown. The biggest jumps were: Kanye West and Jay-Z's "Niggas in Paris" (up 74 places from #98 in 2011 to #24); and Sticky Fingers' "Australia Street" (up 55 places from #70 in 2013 to #15).
Considering the annual Hottest 100 countdowns between 2010 and 2019, all songs that hit #1 in this period made it into the Hottest 100 of the Decade, while two out of the ten songs that formerly reached #2 narrowly missed out: Little Red's "Rock It" (#113) from 2010, and Flume's "Rushing Back" (#152) from 2019.
With some earlier all-time Hottest 100s drawing criticism for being male-dominated (particularly 2009, which featured only two songs with female lead vocalists and 8 with female band members), the Hottest 100 of the Decade demonstrated greater gender equality, featuring 13 songs by solo or lead female vocalists (Lorde, Lana Del Rey, Florence and The Machine, Amy Shark, Sia, Azealia Banks, Billie Eilish, Robyn, Mallrat, Ruby Fields, The Preatures, and Adele), 14 songs with featured female vocalists (Kimbra, Kai, Christine Hoberg, Nicole Millar, Montaigne, Giselle Rosselli, Sirah, Mataya, Sia, Nicki Minaj, Kelly Price, Jezzabell Doran, Amber Coffman and Eliza Doolittle), three with female co-vocalists (Of Monsters And Men, Grouplove, and San Cisco), two with uncredited female vocals (Avicii's "Levels" and Adrian Lux's "Teenage Crime") and three songs with female band members (Angus and Julia Stone and Ball Park Music). The countdown also featured three songs by non-binary gender vocalists (Sam Smith, Tash Sultana, and Cub Sport's Tim Nelson).

References

2019a